39 Aquarii is a star in the zodiac constellation of Aquarius. 39 Aquarii is its Flamsteed designation. It is a faint naked eye star with an apparent visual magnitude of 6.03. It is a double star with a magnitude 9.3 companion at an angular separation of 0.6 arcseconds along a position angle of 257°.

The stellar classification of this star is F0 V; hence it belongs to the category of F-type main sequence stars that generate energy through hydrogen fusion at the core. It is 1.8 billion years old with 1.35 times the mass of the Sun and 1.79 times the Sun's radius. The star is radiating 6.1 times the luminosity of the Sun from its photosphere at an effective temperature of 6,806 K.

References

External links
 Image 39 Aquarii

F-type main-sequence stars
Aquarius (constellation)
BD-14 6229
Aquarii, 039
210705
109624
8462